Galerina hypnorum is a species of agaric fungus in the family Hymenogastraceae.

References

Hymenogastraceae